Dorozsma (de genere Durusma) was a genus (Latin for "clan"; nemzetség in Hungarian) in the Kingdom of Hungary . Their ancient possessions were in Csongrád county (today: village of Kiskundorozsma).

Notable members of the genus

Nicholas I's branch
 Nicholas I Garai
 Nicholas I's first son John Garai
 Nicholas I's second son Nicholas II Garai
 Nicholas II's son, Ladislaus Garai

Paul Garai's branch
 Nicholas I's uncle, Paul I Garai
 Paul's son, Paul Bánfi de Gara
 Paul's other son, Stephen Bánfi de Gara
 Stephen's son, Paul Bánfi de Gara
 Paul's son, Dezső Bánfi de Gara

References

Dorozsma (genus)
People from Csongrád-Csanád County